Evy Kuijpers (born 15 February 1995) is a Dutch professional racing cyclist, who rides for UCI Women's WorldTeam Fenix-Deceuninck. In 2014 and 2015 she rode for the  team.

Major results

2015
 7th Omloop van de IJsseldelta
 8th Dwars door Vlaanderen
 8th EPZ Omloop van Borsele
2018
 2nd Erondegemse Pijl
 3rd Omloop van Borsele
 4th GP Sofie Goos
 7th 7-Dorpenomloop Aalburg
2019
 7th Omloop van de IJsseldelta
 8th Drentse Acht van Westerveld
2022
 8th Overall BeNe Ladies Tour

See also
 List of 2015 UCI Women's Teams and riders

References

External links
 
 

1995 births
Living people
Dutch female cyclists
People from Someren
Cyclists from North Brabant
21st-century Dutch women